Flogging a dead horse (or beating a dead horse in American English) is an idiom ascribed to Anglophones which means that a particular effort is futile, being a waste of time without a positive outcome, e.g. such as flogging a dead horse, which will not compel it to do useful work.

Early usage
The expression is said to have been popularized by the English politician and orator John Bright. Speaking in the House of Commons in March 1859 on Bright's efforts to promote parliamentary reform, Lord Elcho remarked that Bright had not been "satisfied with the results of his winter campaign" and that "a saying was attributed to him [Bright] that he [had] found he was 'flogging a dead horse'."

The earliest instance cited in the Oxford English Dictionary dates from 1872, when The Globe newspaper, reporting the Prime Minister, William Gladstone's, futile efforts to defend the Ecclesiastical Courts and Registries Bill in the Commons, observed that he "might be said to have rehearsed that particularly lively operation known as flogging a dead horse".

Earlier related terms
The phrase may have originated in 17th-century slang, when a horse symbolized hard work.  A "dead horse" came to mean something that had become useless.  In gambling, "playing a dead horse" meant wagering on something, such as a hand of cards, that was almost sure to lose.  In a 17th-century quote from a collection of documents owned by the late Earl of Oxford, Edward Harley,

 

In journeyman printer's slang from the 18th and 19th centuries, work that was charged for on a bill, but not yet carried out, was called "horse". Carrying out that work was said to be "working for a dead horse", since no additional benefit would be gained by the labourer when the work was complete.

Many sailors were paid in advance for their first month's work. In his book Old England and New Zealand, author Alfred Simmons gives a detailed explanation and background of the "Flogging the Dead Horse" ceremony, performed by a ship's crew at the end of the first month of their voyage at which time wages resumed. The sailors would get paid in advance of leaving the harbour, spend their money, and embark the ship with nothing. This situation allowed them to exclaim the horse symbolising their usual hard work, without money for motivation, was dead. However, once a month had passed, the sailors would have reached the Horse latitudes where wages due and paid would prompt the horse to live again.

One of the earliest synonyms may be found in an ancient Greek play by Sophocles, Antigone,

Criticism and proposed replacement by PETA 
In 2018, the organization People for the Ethical Treatment of Animals (PETA) campaigned for the general public to cease usage of the idiom, along with other idioms which mentioned animals, to "remove speciesism from daily conversation". As an alternative, PETA proposed that the general public replace "beating a dead horse" with "feeding a fed horse". PETA justified the replacement by claiming on Twitter that in the same way, "as it became unacceptable to use racist, homophobic, or ableist language, phrases that trivialize cruelty to animals will vanish as more people begin to appreciate animals for who they are and start 'bringing home the bagels' instead of the bacon."

PETA received criticism for its approach from the scientific community, as overfeeding a horse can incite colic, which is deadly to horses. More generally, PETA faced backlash for waging war against colloquialisms and the English language. Comedian Stephen Colbert on his late-night show commented that society has "bigger fish to fry" than to worry about these idioms, in a snub against PETA.

Further reading

References

External links

 
 
 File:En-au-flog a dead horse.ogg

English-language idioms
Metaphors referring to horses